Umberto Lourenço Louzer Filho (born 24 February 1980) is a Brazilian football coach and former player who played as a defensive midfielder. He is the current head coach of CRB.

Playing career

Known as Umberto during his playing days, he was a Paulista youth graduate. In 2005 he joined Marília, but moved to Guarani in May of that year.

After two years featuring sparingly at Bugre, Umberto signed for Atlético Sorocaba. On 27 January 2010, after representing Sendas and Ituiutaba, he was presented at Juventude.

On 11 October 2011, Umberto agreed to a contract with Caxias. He returned to his first club Paulista in 2014, and retired in that year at the age of 34.

Managerial career
Louzer began his managerial career with his first club Paulista's youth setup in 2016, being promoted to assistant of the first team in the following year. In February 2017, he was announced assistant of another club he represented as a player, Guarani.

On 3 January 2018, Louzer was appointed manager of Guarani. On 19 April, after leading the club to a Campeonato Paulista Série A2 title, he renewed his contract for a further year.

Louzer was sacked on 13 November 2018, and was subsequently in charge of Vila Nova and Coritiba during the 2019 season. On 17 February 2020, he was named manager of Chapecoense.

Louzer left Chape on 14 April 2021, after winning the 2020 Campeonato Catarinense and the 2020 Campeonato Brasileiro Série B. The following day, he was named manager of fellow top tier side Sport Recife.

On 23 August 2021, Louzer left Sport on a mutual agreement. The following 22 February, he took over Atlético Goianiense also in the first division.

On 15 May 2022, Louzer was sacked after a poor start in the 2022 Série A. On 22 June, he replaced Eduardo Baptista at the helm of fellow top tier side Juventude, but was himself dismissed on 3 October.

On 5 November 2022, Louzer was named in charge of CRB in the second division for the 2023 season.

Managerial statistics

Honours

Manager
Guarani
 Campeonato Paulista Série A2: 2018

Chapecoense
 Campeonato Catarinense: 2020
 Campeonato Brasileiro Série B: 2020

 Atlético Goianiense
Campeonato Goiano: 2022

References

External links
 

1980 births
Living people
People from Vila Velha
Brazilian footballers
Association football midfielders
Brazilian football managers
Campeonato Brasileiro Série B players
Campeonato Brasileiro Série A managers
Campeonato Brasileiro Série B managers
Paulista Futebol Clube players
Marília Atlético Clube players
Guarani FC players
Clube Atlético Sorocaba players
Boa Esporte Clube players
Esporte Clube Juventude players
Sociedade Esportiva e Recreativa Caxias do Sul players
Guarani FC managers
Vila Nova Futebol Clube managers
Coritiba Foot Ball Club managers
Associação Chapecoense de Futebol managers
Sport Club do Recife managers
Atlético Clube Goianiense managers
Esporte Clube Juventude managers
Sportspeople from Espírito Santo
Clube de Regatas Brasil managers